Kızıldağ Pass is the highest-altitude pass in Turkey

The pass is on the main highway  connecting East Anatolia to Central Anatolia at the borderline between the provinces Sivas and Erzincan. It is difficult to keep the pass open to traffic during the winters because of the harsh weather conditions due to high altitude.

References

External links
Some photos

Landforms of Erzincan Province
Landforms of Sivas Province
Mountain passes of Turkey